Moses Hampton (October 28, 1803 – June 27, 1878) was a Whig member of the U.S. House of Representatives from Pennsylvania.

Biography
Moses Hampton was born in Beaver, Pennsylvania.  He moved with his parents to Trumbull County, Ohio.  He pursued classical studies and graduated from Washington College (now known as Washington and Jefferson College) in Washington, Pennsylvania, in 1827.  He studied law in Uniontown, Pennsylvania, was admitted to the bar in 1829 and commenced practice in Somerset, Pennsylvania.  He moved to Pittsburgh, Pennsylvania, in 1838 and continued the practice of law, founding the law firm which would ultimately become Buchanan, Ingersoll & Rooney.

Hampton was elected as a Whig to the Thirtieth and Thirty-first Congresses.  He was not a candidate for renomination in 1850.  He served as president judge of the Allegheny County, District Court from 1853 to 1873.  He died at his home, "Hampton Place," adjoining the village of Wilkinsburg, Pennsylvania.  Interment in Allegheny Cemetery.

He is the namesake of Hampton Township, Allegheny County, Pennsylvania.

Sources

The Political Graveyard

External links

Notes

1803 births
1878 deaths
Washington & Jefferson College alumni
Pennsylvania lawyers
Pennsylvania state court judges
Whig Party members of the United States House of Representatives from Pennsylvania
Burials at Allegheny Cemetery
19th-century American politicians
19th-century American judges
19th-century American lawyers